Dungan may refer to:

 Donegan, an Irish surname, sometimes spelled Dungan
 Dungan people, a group of Muslim people of Hui origin
 Dungan language
 Dungan, sometimes used to refer to Hui Chinese people generally
 Dungan Mountains in Sibi District, Pakistan

See also
 
 Dongan (disambiguation)
 Dungan revolt (1862–77)
 Dungan revolt (1895–96)
 Battle of Dungan's Hill, Ireland, 1647